Joonas Einari Kolkka (born 28 September 1974) is a Finnish retired professional footballer who played as a left winger most of his career, but could also play on the right wing. Having started his career in his native Finland, he went on to play for several clubs in the Netherlands, Greece, Germany, England, and the USA.

Club career
Born in Lahti, Kolkka started his career with Reipas Lahti and MyPa in Finland's Veikkausliiga. He won the Finnish Cup with MyPa in 1995 before joining Netherlands' Willem II the same year. In 1998 Kolkka joined Dutch club PSV Eindhoven on a four-year contract. At PSV he won two league championships and got to play in the UEFA Champions League. Kolkka then moved to Greek side Panathinaikos in 2001, and he spent two seasons there. After leaving Greece, Kolkka played a season each for Borussia Mönchengladbach of the German Bundesliga and Crystal Palace of the English Premiership. He scored at both Anfield and Old Trafford during his stay at the club, and also scored in the thrilling 3–3 draw with Norwich. He was released by Palace, and returned to the Netherlands in 2005, signing a one-year deal with ADO Den Haag. After an impressive season with ADO, he was signed by Dutch side Feyenoord in the summer of 2006, and played until summer 2011 for NAC Breda. In 2011, he was signed by his former club, Willem II, being employed as a player and a sales manager of the club.

On 4 May 2012, it was announced that Kolkka had signed a three-month-contract with Texas Dutch Lions, in the third level of American football (not Dayton Dutch Lions). After his contract with the Dutch Lions expired, Kolkka returned to the Netherlands, working as a youth coach for his former club PSV.

International career
Kolkka made his debut for the Finland national team on 26 October 1994 against Estonia, and was a regular in the Finland lineup until 2010.

Career statistics

International

Scores and results list Finland's goal tally first, score column indicates score after each Kolkka goal.

Honours
MyPa
Finnish Cup: 1995

PSV
Eredivisie: 1999–2000, 2000–01

Finland
Nordic Football Championship: 2000–01

References

External links
 
  
 

1974 births
Living people
Sportspeople from Lahti
Finnish footballers
Finland international footballers
Association football wingers
Reipas Lahti players
Myllykosken Pallo −47 players
Willem II (football club) players
PSV Eindhoven players
Panathinaikos F.C. players
Borussia Mönchengladbach players
Crystal Palace F.C. players
ADO Den Haag players
Feyenoord players
NAC Breda players
Veikkausliiga players
Eredivisie players
Eerste Divisie players
Super League Greece players
Bundesliga players
Premier League players
Finnish expatriate footballers
Finnish expatriate sportspeople in the Netherlands
Expatriate footballers in the Netherlands
Finnish expatriate sportspeople in Greece
Expatriate footballers in Greece
Finnish expatriate sportspeople in Germany
Expatriate footballers in Germany
Finnish expatriate sportspeople in England
Expatriate footballers in England
Finnish expatriate sportspeople in the United States
Expatriate soccer players in the United States